Artem Pestryakov (born 30 July 1999) is a Russian footballer currently playing as a midfielder for Codru Lozova.

Career statistics

Club

Notes

References

1999 births
Living people
Russian footballers
Russian expatriate footballers
Association football midfielders
Moldovan Super Liga players
FC Codru Lozova players
Russian expatriate sportspeople in Moldova
Expatriate footballers in Moldova